Lake Shabla is a lagoon (liman) in the north-eastern Bulgaria, which separated from the Black Sea by the sandbar. The area of the water body is 0.8 km2, depth 0.4–4 m, salinity 0,4%. The lagoon is located on 3 km east from the town of Shabla.

References

External links
 Lake Shabla

Landforms of Dobrich Province
Shabla
Shabla
Bulgarian Black Sea Coast
Shabla